Kari Swenson (born 1961) is a veterinarian in Bozeman, Montana and former biathlete who earned a bronze medal as a member of the 1984 U.S. relay team competing in the first women's Biathlon World Championships in Chamonix, France. Swenson placed fifth overall in the women's 10-km final, which, at the time, marked the best performance for a U.S. biathlete of either sex in 26 years of international biathlon competition. In 2015, Swenson and her 1984 teammates were inducted into the U.S. Biathlon Hall of Fame.

Background
In 1970, Swenson's father, Bob, former head of the Physics Department at Temple University, moved from a suburb in Philadelphia, Pennsylvania with his wife Janet and their three children, relocating to Bozeman where he became head of the Physics Department at Montana State University. Janet Swenson was a nurse and ski patrol volunteer, and Kari took up cross-country skiing in her youth.

By 1984, Kari Swenson had become a member of the three-woman U.S. biathlon relay team. They competed at the first women's Biathlon World Championships in Chamonix, France. The team was awarded a bronze medal for their performance in the event. Swenson placed fifth overall in the women's 10-km final, a record performance at the time for a U.S. biathlete of either gender in 26 years of international biathlon competition. In 2015, Swenson and her 1984 teammates, Holly Beattie and Julie Newnam, were inducted into the U.S. Biathlon Hall of Fame.

Abduction 
Following the 1984 biathlon season, Swenson took a summer job at a Montana guest ranch near Big Sky, Montana, where she could train daily. On July 15, 1984, while on a training run in the Ulerys Lakes area, Swenson was abducted by Don Nichols and his son Dan. The two survivalists intended to force her to become Dan's bride. When Swenson did not return to her job that evening as expected, a search party was organized.

By the following morning, over 20 searchers were combing the mountains. Swenson's friend Alan Goldstein and another ranch worker, Jim Schwalbe, paired up during the search and stumbled onto the camp. Because the Nichols had threatened to shoot any rescuers, Swenson began shouting out to warn the searchers away. Swenson later recounted that Don Nichols ordered his son Dan to "shut me up." The younger Nichols looked directly at Swenson and shot her. "It wasn't an accident," she said in a 2019 interview, in reference to his later defense claiming it was.

As the two rescuers approached, Don Nichols fired a single shot from his rifle, killing Goldstein with a gunshot wound to the face. The impact knocked him backward out of Swenson's sight. Schwalbe managed to escape. Knowing they had been located, the Nichols' unchained Swenson, then fled, leaving her alone. The bullet had entered her chest just below her collarbone, went through her lung, collapsing it, and exited below her shoulder blade.

Swenson remained in the clearing, in pain so intense it prevented her from moving, for four hours before she was rescued. It had been over 18 hours since her abduction. Swenson later attributed her survival to the breath control skills she developed as a biathlete.

Kidnappers' fate 
Don and Dan Nichols were captured in December 1984. They were tried separately in Virginia City, the Madison County seat, prosecuted by Marc Racicot, then a staff attorney for the Montana Attorney General. In May 1985, Dan Nichols was sentenced to 10 years in prison for kidnapping and misdemeanor assault. In September 1985, Don Nichols was sentenced to 85 years for kidnapping, murder, and aggravated assault. The younger Nichols was released on parole in 1991 and stayed out of trouble until 2011 when he was arrested on drug charges and given a four-year prison sentence.

Don Nichols came up for parole review four times, and each time, the Swenson family and their supporters vigorously opposed his release. On April 27, 2017, the elder Nichols, then age 86, was granted parole after serving 32 years of his sentence. He was released from prison on August 23, 2017.

Media coverage
Swenson and her family were not pleased by some of the coverage in the press because they felt it glamorized her abductors as mythical "mountain men," and stereotyped her, a champion athlete, as a "proper Belle." "Using this description in conjunction with these two crazy misfits is truly maligning the mystique and legends of the mountain man," wrote Swenson in a 2012 op-ed. In 1989, Swenson's mother authored a book written from the family's perspective, titled Victims: The Kari Swenson Story. In the book, Kari stated, "the Nichols lived in the mountains part-time but they couldn't survive there, at least not without poaching, breaking into cabins and stealing supplies, leaving the mountains for months at a time and purchasing modern equipment. Ultimately they were caught without a fight because they were cold, hungry, and tired of living in the mountains. These are not mountain men."

A two-hour made-for-TV drama titled "The Abduction of Kari Swenson", produced by NBC aired on March 8, 1987. It starred Tracy Pollan in the leading role as Kari Swenson. Swenson contributed as a technical advisor during production and also filmed her own ski sequences. Season 2, episode 5 of TV show American Justice, the episode titled "Kidnapped," premiered on January 5, 1995, and spent the first segment of the episode reenacting the story of Kari Swenson's abduction and the Nichols’ subsequent trial. Her story was also featured on Investigation Discovery in the TV series Your Worst Nightmare, season 3, episode 9 titled "Into the Wild" premiering on February 11, 2017. In 2019 her story was the focus of an ESPN 30 for 30 podcast titled "Out of the Woods." The 30 for 30 podcast episode was also featured in the Criminal episode #128, titled "Deep Breath".

Later life 
Following the kidnapping and the immediate aftermath from her injuries, Swenson returned to training, earned a spot on the United States Biathlon team again, and competed in the 1986 biathlon competition in Oslo, Norway, where she finished fourth. That year she retired from biathlon competition. She then enrolled at Colorado State University Veterinary School, where she graduated in 1990. After working for five years at a small animal veterinary practice in Steamboat Springs, Colorado, she returned to Montana, and as of 2019 was a practicing veterinarian in Bozeman.

References

1962 births
American female biathletes
Biathlon World Championships medalists
Formerly missing people
Kidnapped American people
Living people
Sportspeople from Bozeman, Montana
Colorado State University alumni
American veterinarians
Women veterinarians
21st-century American women